Polladhavan is a 1980 Indian Tamil-language action thriller film produced by S. Ravi, written and directed by his father Muktha Srinivasan. A remake of the 1976 Kannada film Premada Kanike, it stars Rajinikanth, Lakshmi and Sripriya. The film revolves around a wealthy merchant who keeps his daughter's nanny, an eyewitness to a murder committed by him, captive in his house.

Rajinikanth initially wanted to star in a Tamil remake of the Hindi film Vishwanath (1978), but as Ravi did not like the film, they decided to collaborate on a different project, eventually choosing to remake Premada Kanike which Rajinikanth had already seen and liked. The film was shot mainly in Bangalore, with additional shooting taking place in Madras, Shimla and Kashmir.

Polladhavan was released on 6 November 1980, Diwali. The film became a commercial success, and was one of many films which helped Rajinikanth to carve out a niche for himself in vendetta roles.

Plot 
Seetha, a young woman, is travelling via train with her nephew Raju to an estate to attend her job interview as a nanny to the estate merchant Manohar's daughter. Her co-passenger tries to rape her, but suddenly he is shot dead. Seetha sees the murderer and clearly remembers his face, and reports the murder to Moorthy, a police inspector. Then she is appointed for the nanny position, and she and Manohar's daughter Shoba grow fond of each other.

Manohar, who is extremely fond of his daughter, returns from his journey. Seetha meets him, only to realise that he is the murderer she saw on the train. Manohar threatens Seetha not to tell anyone and makes sure to prevent her from leaving his estate as she is keen on reporting him to the police.

Seetha tries many times to escape but is always caught. She does not even tell the police when she meets them, as Manohar threatens to kill Raju if she did. Later, Seetha somehow sees beneath the rough, mean Manohar and grows fond of him but is confused why such a nice man is acting so arrogantly.

In flashbacks, Manohar and a woman named Kumudha fell in love and married; shortly thereafter, their daughter, Shoba, was born. However, Kumudha's uncle Chandru, who was eager to marry Kumudha but who was sent to jail by Manohar as he tried to kill him, was released from jail after completing his term. When Manohar was out of the house, Chandru raped Kumudha; due to this, she commits suicide, and Manohar wants to die with her, but she makes him vow that he will get revenge on Chandru for separating them and to take care of Shoba.

Manohar reveals that the man he killed on the train was Chandru. Seetha now understands his acts and vows not to tell anyone. Moorthy's colleague is curious about Seetha; she said that she remembered the face and was eager to find the murderer, but now she had told him she has forgotten the face, hence he suspects Seetha to be the murderer, and Moorthy agrees with his belief. On Shoba's birthday, Manohar is to announce that he is to hand over all his wealth to Seetha and surrender to the police, but before this, the police arrive and try to arrest Seetha. Manohar saves her by confessing to the murder, leading to his arrest.

A few years later, Manohar is released and reunites with Seetha and Shoba.

Cast 
 Rajinikanth as Manohar
 Lakshmi as Seetha
 Sripriya as Kumudha
 Suruli Rajan as Manohar's manager
 Sivachandran as Chandru
 Delhi Ganesh as Moorthy the police inspector
 V. Gopalakrishnan as a police officer
 Senthamarai as Ramaiya
 K. Natraj as Kumudha's brother

Production 
Rajinikanth initially wanted to star in a Tamil remake of the Hindi film Vishwanath (1978), with S. Ravi producing. Ravi watched the film, but did not like it; Rajinikanth and Ravi then decided to remake a different film. K. Balaji gave Ravi a video cassette of the Kannada film Premada Kanike (1976), and told him to tell Rajinikanth to watch it. Rajinikanth told Ravi he had already watched the film multiple times and liked it, so it was decided to remake the film in Tamil as Polladhavan. The film was directed by Ravi's father Muktha Srinivasan (who also wrote the screenplay) and produced by Ravi under Vidhya Movies. The film was made in CinemaScope. Cinematography was handled by M. Karnan, and editing by V. P. Krishna. Srinivasan cast Delhi Ganesh after seeing his performance in the play Thuppariyum Saambu. Shooting for the film took place primarily at Bangalore, with additional shooting taking place in Chennai, Shimla and Kashmir.

Soundtrack 
The soundtrack was composed by M. S. Viswanathan, with lyrics by Kannadasan. The song "Chinnakkannane" is set in the Hindustani raga known as Brindavani Sarang.

Release and reception 
Polladhavan was released on 6 November 1980, Diwali. Nalini Sastry of Kalki wrote that the director, by taking an ordinary story and transforming it, was himself a ruthless man. Despite facing competition from other Diwali releases such as Varumayin Niram Sivappu and Nizhalgal, the film was a commercial success, and cemented Rajinikanth's "hold over the box office". Rajinikanth also managed to carve out a niche for himself in vendetta roles such as that in Polladhavan. The film was, however, less successful in Malaysia. Rajinikanth's bearded appearance with sunglasses was later used in Baashha (1995).

References

Bibliography

External links 
 
 

1980 action thriller films
1980 films
1980s Tamil-language films
Films directed by Muktha Srinivasan
Films scored by M. S. Viswanathan
Indian action thriller films
Indian films about revenge
Indian rape and revenge films
Tamil remakes of Kannada films